Johnny Leo'o (born 3 October 1978 in Auckland, New Zealand) is a New Zealand rugby union footballer. His usual position is at Flanker. He is 1.85m tall and weighs 100 kg. He played for Canterbury in the NPC and he also represented Crusaders in the Super 14 rugby competition. He played 60 games for Canterbury and 6 games for Bay of Plenty. He made his debut in 1999 for Bay of Plenty against Auckland. He made his Super Rugby debut for the Crusaders against the Stormers in the 2002 Super 12 season. He is part Samoan and for that reason the Samoa Rugby Football Union wanted him to play for Samoa but he declined and he went on to play for the New Zealand sevens team in 2000 and 2001 before being capped again at national level in 2006 when he made the Junior All Blacks. He played in over 40 matches for the Crusaders scoring 5 tries. He now plays his rugby for Racing Métro 92 in the Top 14 competition. 

Johnny now studies at Massey University through correspondence to be a Teacher. He is in his last year of his degree.

References

External links
 Johnny's Crusaders Profile

1978 births
Bay of Plenty rugby union players
Canterbury rugby union players
Crusaders (rugby union) players
Expatriate rugby union players in France
Living people
New Zealand rugby union players
Racing 92 players
Rugby union flankers
New Zealand expatriate rugby union players
New Zealand expatriate sportspeople in France
Rugby union players from Auckland